The Tasmanian Archive and Heritage Office (TAHO), formerly known as the Archives Office of Tasmania, is a part of Libraries Tasmania, located in Hobart.
The Archives Office of Tasmania had been a separate entity from the  Tasmanian state library, despite being housed in the same building.
The W E Crowther collection was a special component of the State Library prior to the amalgamation, and was frequently referred to as being the major part of the Heritage Collections of the State Library.
TAHO was established in  2008,  as an amalgamation of the various existing services, to provide a single entry point into Tasmanian social history, government records and cultural artefacts.

Among its holdings are the Tasmania Police records from the Port Arthur massacre and information on the state's lighthouses and military history.

References

External links

Libraries in Tasmania
Libraries established in 2008
2008 establishments in Australia